Riplingham is a hamlet in the East Riding of Yorkshire, England.

Riplingham is part in the civil parish of Rowley and part in the civil parish of South Cave.

It has no shops, but does have a good view of Hull, and the surrounding area, including the River Humber and its south bank.

It is also the site of a medieval village.

In 1955 a Ham class minesweeper  was named after the village.

References

External links

Hamlets in the East Riding of Yorkshire
Deserted medieval villages in the East Riding of Yorkshire